Powerscourt House is the former Dublin townhouse of Viscount Powerscourt and now the Powerscourt Townhouse Centre, located on South William Street, Dublin.

History 
It was constructed in the eighteenth century for Richard Wingfield, 3rd Viscount Powerscourt. He was a member of the Irish House of Lords. The townhouse enabled him and his family to stay there when they were visiting from their Powerscourt Estate in Enniskerry, County Wicklow.

The House was designed by Robert Mack and dates from between 1771 to 1774, and has been characterised as the "last-gasp Palladianism on a grand scale on a narrow street". The court at the rear of the building was created with the addition of 3 brown-brick office buildings in 1809 to 1811.

Within a couple of years of the abolition of the Parliament of Ireland, the viscount sold this Dublin residence since he received his seat now at the House of Lords in London. Many other peers also sold their palatial Dublin residences, which led to an economic and cultural decline of the city.

The government bought the property for £15,000 and between 1811 and 1835 the Stamp Office, where impressed stamp duty newspaper stamps, a form of revenue stamp were applied to newspapers, journals and periodical, was located in Powerscourt House.

Shopping Centre 
Powerscourt House was purchased and redeveloped as a shopping centre between 1978 and 1981 by Robin Power. The journalist Frank McDonald described the conversion of the building as "imaginative" and "the city's smartest shopping centre".

Gallery

See also 
 Powerscourt

References

External links 

 

Buildings and structures in Dublin (city)
Shopping centres in County Dublin
Richard Cassels buildings